Geneviève Page (born Geneviève Bonjean, 13 December 1927) is a French actress with a film career spanning fifty years and also numerous English-speaking film productions. She is the daughter of French art collector Jacques Paul Bonjean (1899–1990).

Early life
She was born to a family of aesthetes, like Jacques Bonjean, who collected art from 17 century France, her mother Germaine (born Lipman) Bonjean, and her godfather Christian Dior. At the age of six, her godfather was poor and played the piano with Page's mother, and he even talked to Page about talking to adults. She recalls, "He had no money at the time, and drew hats for big houses. He had lunch every other day at home and played the piano, with my mother in my room, with four hands. I took refuge in the bathroom to learn my lessons." At the age of twelve, Page read some works by Voltaire, and to her mother's surprise, her father replied "If she can't read Voltaire, she can't read anyone." Despite this, she was a very talented young girl, playing Musset at Théâtre National Populaire and entering the Conservatory.

Career
Her film début was in Pas de pitié pour les femmes (1951), followed by Fanfan la Tulipe (1952), in which she played Madame de Pompadour alongside Gérard Philipe and Gina Lollobrigida. Since then, she has appeared in Italian, French, British and American films. She co-starred with Robert Mitchum and Ingrid Thulin in Foreign Intrigue (1956), Dirk Bogarde and Capucine in Song Without End (1960), Charlton Heston and Sophia Loren in El Cid (1961), and was seen in Grand Prix (1966) with James Garner and Belle de Jour (1967), with Catherine Deneuve and directed by Luis Buñuel. She appeared with Deneuve again when she played Countess Larisch in Mayerling (1968), also co-starring with Ava Gardner and James Mason.

Billy Wilder cast her as the mysterious villain in The Private Life of Sherlock Holmes (1970), her best known role because the character she played used her sex appeal to manipulate Holmes. She appeared in Robert Altman's Beyond Therapy (1987) and continued to act until 2003.

Theater
She acted in 1943 in Le Soulier de Satin and in Oh! Le Beaux Jours, both of which were directed by Jean-Louis Barrault Madeleine Renaud Co. Her theater career continued in the 1980s and 1990s, with Les larmes amères de Petra von Kant (The Bitter Tears of Petra von Kant) (1980), Lan nuit de rois (Twelfth Night, William Shakespeare), La femme sur le lit (The Woman on the Bed, Franco Brusati) 1994, Delicate Balance (1998).

Selected filmography

Accolades

Personal life
She was educated at École du Louvre and Conservatoire national des arts et métiers. Page has been married to Jean-Claude Bujard since 1959; the couple have two children. In an interview from 2013, she said she was having stewardship problems in her house and that she was no longer used to speaking.

References

External links
 
 allmovie.com
 

1927 births
20th-century French actresses
21st-century French actresses
Actresses from Paris
French film actresses
French television actresses
Living people